Fitil (Fuse) is a popular Soviet short film and television anthology series which ran for 608 episodes. Some of the episodes were aimed at children, and were called , Little Fuse.
Each issue contained from the few short segments: documentary, fictional and animated ones. Fitilyok eventually became an entirely separate show for children and was renamed Yeralash, (Russian: Ералаш) meaning "jumble" or "mishmash." 

It was directed by various artists, including Leonid Gaidai who presented his famous trio of Nikulin, Vitsin and Morgunov to the cast.

It was called "the anecdotes from the Soviet government" in the USSR.

List of episodes

See also 
 Yeralash, another Soviet popular TV series for children
 Multiplikatsionniy Krokodil

References

Notes

External links
  Big Fitil (1963) at IMDb
  starring Faina Ranevskaya

Russia-1 original programming
Russian comedy television series
1963 Soviet television series debuts
1960s Soviet television series

2008 Russian television series endings